USS Howard (DDG-83) is an  in the United States Navy. She is named for Medal of Honor recipient First Sergeant Jimmie E. Howard, USMC. This ship is the 33rd destroyer of her class. USS Howard was the 19th ship of this class to be built by Bath Iron Works at Bath, Maine, and construction began on 8 December 1998. She was launched and christened on 20 November 1999. She was commissioned into the Navy on 20 October 2001.

Namesake 
The ship is named in honor of 1st Sgt. Jimmie E. Howard, USMC (1929–1993), recipient of the Medal of Honor for his leadership of a platoon against repeated attacks by a battalion-sized Viet Cong force. After receiving severe wounds from an enemy grenade, he distributed ammunition to his men and directed air strikes on the enemy. By dawn, his beleaguered platoon still held their position. Howard had also received the Silver Star Medal for his service in the Korean War. Every time Howard set to sea from her previous homeport of San Diego, she passed within view of 1st Sgt. Howard's grave at Fort Rosecrans National Cemetery and saluted her namesake.

Service history
On 16 February 2007, Howard was awarded the 2006 Battle "E" award.

On 28 September 2008, Howard was reported to be in pursuit of the Ukrainian ship , which on 25 September 2008 was captured by Somali pirates en route to Kenya. Faina was reported to be carrying 33 Russian-built T-72 tanks along with ammunition and spare parts. Faina was eventually released by the pirates 5 February 2009.

In 2008, Howard received the 2008 Arleigh Burke Fleet Trophy Award and provided humanitarian assistance to the Philippines.

CDR Amy M. McInnis is the tenth Commanding Officer, assuming command on 19 November 2015. CDR John J Fay was the ninth Commanding Officer, relieving CDR Zook. CDR David Zook was the eighth commanding officer, relieving CDR Bergmann on 21 September 2012.  CDR Andree (Ande) E. Bergmann replaced CDR Scott Switzer on 17 March 2011 as the seventh commanding officer. Scott Switzer was the sixth commanding officer of Howard, replacing CDR Curtis Goodnight on 8 May 2009 during a ceremony at San Diego.

Currently, Howard is a member of Destroyer Squadron 15 and Carrier Strike Group Five.

On 26 November 2021, Howard made a port call in Wellington, New Zealand. It is the first time a U.S. Navy warship has made a port call in New Zealand since 2016.

Coat of arms

Shield 
The shield has a background of light blue, dark blue, and gold. The upper shield consists of an oriental dragon, while the bottom contains stars configured to the Southern Cross.

The traditional Navy colors were chosen for the shield because dark blue and gold represents the sea and excellence respectively. The oriental dragon symbolizes the ship's service in the Pacific and fighting spirit of the platoon under the leadership of Gunnery Sergeant Howard. The stars are configured to the Southern Cross and represent the First Marine Division patch worn by Gunnery Sergeant Howard.

Crest 
The crest consists of a Medal of Honor neck pad in the shape of a radar array with a crossed Navy and Marine sword.

USS Howards combat actions and war fighting legacy are represented by the six battle stars. Gunnery Sergeant Howard was awarded a Medal of Honor for gallantry and intrepidity under fire, which is represented by the neck pad. The neck pad also highlights the modern warfare capabilities, represented with the AEGIS array. A Crossed Naval Sword and Marine Mameluke signify teamwork and cooperation, exhibited with support from USS Howards advanced combat systems for Marines ashore.

Motto 
The motto is written on a scroll of white with blue reverse side.

The ships' motto is "Ready for Victory". The motto is a reference to the honor, courage, and commitment of USS Howards sailors for justifying she is ready for all operations in peace and will always be victorious in combat.

Seal 
The coat of arms in full color as in the blazon, upon a white background enclosed within a dark blue oval border edged on the outside with a gold rope and bearing the inscription "USS Howard" at the top and "DDG 83" in the base all gold.

Awards
Howard has been awarded the Navy Battle "E" several times	
  1 January -	31 December 2006

References

External links

 

 

Arleigh Burke-class destroyers
Destroyers of the United States
Ships built in Bath, Maine
Piracy in Somalia
1999 ships